The College of Central Florida (CF) is a public college with campuses in Marion, Citrus, and Levy counties. It is part of the Florida College System. Founded in 1957 as Central Florida Junior College, CF has grown to span three counties and include the Appleton Museum of Art and Vintage Farm.

The college is accredited by the Southern Association of Colleges and Schools Commission on Colleges to award baccalaureate, Associate in Arts, and Associate in Science degrees as well as certificates. The college started offering bachelor degree programs in Business and Organizational Management in 2010, followed by Early Childhood Education in 2011, and Nursing in 2014.

History
College of Central Florida was established in 1957 under the name Central Florida Junior College, serving Citrus, Levy and Marion counties in Florida. In 1958, instruction began, with only 320 students using temporary facilities at the Marion County Vocational School.  In 1966, the school merged with Hampton Junior College. Hampton Junior College was originally opened in 1958 as well, as one of the first black, two-year colleges in the state.  In 1971, the school changed its name to Central Florida Community College.  On May 25, 2010, CFCC officially changed its name to College of Central Florida.

Over time, an additional  were added to the Citrus campus, and the Citrus Learning and Conference Center opened in fall 2009.

The Jack Wilkinson Levy Campus opened in fall 2017, replacing the Levy Center located in Chiefland.

CF's Hampton Center, which offers health occupation courses and community outreach programs, opened in 1996 on the site of the former Florida State Fire College in West Ocala. In 2004, the facility was completely rebuilt.

The college maintained a partnership interest in the Appleton Museum of Art for more than a decade before accepting full responsibility for operations in 2004.

Locations

The College of Central Florida operates three campuses and two sites in Marion, Citrus, and Levy counties.

Campuses
 Ocala Campus located at 3001 S.W. College Road, Ocala, FL 34474
 Citrus Campus located at 3800 S. Lecanto Highway, Lecanto, FL 34461
 Jack Wilkinson Levy Campus located at 15390 N.W. Highway 19, Chiefland, FL 32626

Sites
 Appleton Museum of Art located at 4333 E Silver Springs Boulevard, Ocala, Florida 34470
 Hampton Center located at 1501 W. Silver Springs Boulevard, Ocala FL 34475

Awards and recognition
 Ranked among the top 150 colleges in the nation for quality in 2011, 2013 and 2017 in by the Aspen Institute College Excellence program.
 Ranked No. 20 in affordability in the United States by the U.S. Department of Education.

Tuition
Tuition at the College of Central Florida has not been raised for five years. For Florida residents, the cost per credit hour is $107.10 for students pursuing an associate degree and $122.89 for students pursuing a bachelor's degree. The average cost of tuition for a 12-credit course load for two semesters is $2,522 for associate-level courses and $2,906 for bachelor's-level courses.

Student profile
College-wide unduplicated headcount was 10,854 for the 2017–2018 academic year.

Headcount by campus
 Ocala Campus: 9,546
 Citrus Campus: 4,264
 Levy Campus: 1,872
 Hampton Center: 151

Enrollment by program
 Associate in Arts: 63%
 Associate in Science, Associate in Applied Science: 20.8%
 Baccalaureate: 10.1%
 Adult Vocational Certificate: 2.4%
 College Credit Certificate: 1.5%
 Other: 2.2%

Student demographics

Gender
 Female: 62.4%
 Male: 37.5%
 Undeclared: 0.1%

Age, credit and noncredit
 Under 18: 11.5%
 18-24: 49.0%
 25-34: 20.8%
 35-44: 9.3%
 45 and Older: 9.4%

Race/ethnicity
 White (not of Hispanic origin): 54.7%
 Black (not of Hispanic origin): 14.1%
 Hispanic: 15.6%
 Undeclared: 10.9%
 Asian: 3.1%
 American Indian/Pacific Islanders: 1.6%

Student life
Each of the three CF campuses has its own Student Life organization to promote campus activities and engagement. Collectively, the campuses hold more than 50 student clubs for academic, athletic, social, and service learning opportunities.

Athletics
College of Central Florida fields intercollegiate athletics teams in men's and women's basketball, baseball, fast-pitch softball and women's volleyball. The Patriots compete in the Mid-Florida Conference of the National Junior College Athletic Association (NJCAA) Region VIII and the Florida State College Activities Association.

CF's tennis programs produced three of the program's NJCAA national championships. The men's program won national titles in 1963 and 1981; the women's team won the NJCAA Division II championship in 2001. The men's basketball team won the NJCAA championship in 2013.

The Patriots won five state championships across three sports in the 1990s, including women's basketball titles in 1992 and in 1997, a men's basketball title in 1996, and consecutive baseball championships in 1997 and 1998.

The CF athletics program annually produces NCAA student-athletes and has started the careers of several professional athletes. Its prominent athletic alumni include former Major League Baseball players Brian Buscher, Mike Figga, and Bill Hurst. Clinton Hart, a seven-year veteran of the National Football League, began his collegiate athletic career as an outfielder for the Patriots baseball team.

Since 2006, three CF alumni have celebrated national championships at the NCAA level. Alberta Auguste won consecutive NCAA women's basketball titles at the University of Tennessee in 2006 and 2007; Nick Ebert won a College World Series title at the University of South Carolina in 2010; and Breanna Fort won an NCAA Division II national championship at Clayton State University in 2011.

In the spring of 2010, men's basketball standout Ricardo Ratliffe capped an historic two-year career at CF by winning the 2010 NJCAA Male Student-Athlete of the Year Award. The honor, selected from among all male student-athletes in all sports across the NJCAA's 525 member schools, marked the first national player of the year award won by a CF student-athlete.

In June 2010, the CF District Board of Trustees voted to add women's volleyball to the school's athletics program, with its inaugural season scheduled for the fall of 2011.

The College of Central Florida announced in 2019 that the volleyball and basketball programs would be cancelled following the 2019–2020 seasons.

Notable alumni

 Dennis Baxley, member of the Florida Senate
 Brian Buscher, MLB baseball player
 Evaldas Dainys, professional basketball player
 Charles Dean, member of the Florida Senate
 Javonte Douglas, professional basketball player
 Mike Figga, MLB baseball player
 Clinton Hart, NFL football player
 Patrick Hilliman, professional basketball player
 Malia Hosaka, professional wrestler
 Jim Huber, sports announcer and commentator for CNN and Turner Sports
 Bill Hurst, MLB baseball player
 Kurt Kelly, member of the Florida House of Representatives
 Todd Lickliter, NCAA men's basketball coach at Butler University and University of Iowa
 Kevin "K. J." Maura, professional basketball player
 Carlos Eduardo Mendoza, United States federal judge
 Darryl Monroe, professional basketball player, 2016 Israeli Basketball Premier League MVP
 Mathiang Muo, professional basketball player
 Jordan Parks, professional basketball player
 Nate Pearson, professional baseball player
 Eddy Polanco, professional basketball player
 Ricardo Ratliffe, professional basketball player
 Wade Simoneaux, baseball coach
 Brandon Tabb, professional basketball player

Gallery

References

External links

 

Buildings and structures in Ocala, Florida
Educational institutions established in 1957
Universities and colleges accredited by the Southern Association of Colleges and Schools
Education in Marion County, Florida
Education in Citrus County, Florida
Education in Levy County, Florida
Florida College System
1957 establishments in Florida
NJCAA athletics